Dorset & Wiltshire Fire and Rescue Service is a statutory emergency fire and rescue service covering the local authority areas of Wiltshire, Swindon, Dorset and Bournemouth, Christchurch and Poole in England.

The service was created on 1 April 2016 by the merger of Dorset Fire and Rescue Service and Wiltshire Fire and Rescue Service. The former headquarters at Poundbury, Dorset, and Potterne, Wiltshire, are retained as area offices; emergency calls for the combined area have been answered by a control centre at Potterne since August 2015.

Provision of the service is by the Dorset & Wiltshire Fire and Rescue Authority, which has 18 elected members from all four constituent councils and is chaired by Dorset councillor Rebecca Knox.

In September 2016, Ben Ansell was appointed as the service's second Chief Fire Officer, succeeding Darran Gunter with effect from December 2016.

Stations
The service has 50 fire stations covering its area: six in the Bournemouth, Christchurch & Poole council areas, 20 in the rest of Dorset, three in Swindon, and 21 in the rest of Wiltshire.

The service uses a variety of duty systems including wholetime firefighters, retained firefighters (on-call), and day-crewed 08:3018:30 Monday to Friday. 
Some stations also have fire service co-responders, supporting the work of South Western Ambulance Service.

Other facilities include:

Performance
In 2018/2019, every fire and rescue service in England and Wales was subjected to a statutory inspection by Her Majesty's Inspectorate of Constabulary and Fire & Rescue Services (HIMCFRS). The inspection investigated how well the service performs in each of three areas. On a scale of outstanding, good, requires improvement and inadequate, Dorset and Wiltshire Fire and Rescue Service was rated as follows:

See also
Fire services in the United Kingdom
List of British firefighters killed in the line of duty

References

External links

 
Dorset & Wiltshire Fire and Rescue Service at HMICFRS

Fire and rescue services of England
Organisations based in Wiltshire